Teucrium balthazaris is a species of flowering plant in the family Lamiaceae. It is found only in Spain. Its natural habitat is Mediterranean-type shrubby vegetation. It is threatened by habitat loss.

References

balthazaris
Endemic flora of Spain
Endemic flora of the Iberian Peninsula
Matorral shrubland
Near threatened plants
Taxonomy articles created by Polbot